Vijay Babu (born 14 May 1976) is an Indian film producer, actor, and businessman, who works in the Malayalam film industry. He is the founder of the film production company Friday Film House.

Vijay Babu is best known for producing and starring in the films Philips and the Monkey Pen (2013), Peruchazhi (2014), Aadu (2015), Adi Kapyare Kootamani (2015), Mudhugauv (2016), Angamaly Diaries (2017), Aadu 2 (2017), June (2019), Sufiyum Sujatayum (2021), and Home (2021). In 2014, he won the Kerala State Film Award for Best Children's Film (as producer) for his production firm for Philips and the Monkey Pen. The character Sarbath Shameer played by Vijay Babu appearing in Aadu film series had developed into a cult following.

Sufiyum Sujatayum, produced by him under his banner Friday Film House, is the first Malayalam film to have a direct release on an OTT platform, Amazon Prime Video. Babu is known for bankrolling many experimental films and supporting upcoming filmmakers in the industry.

Early life and family 
Vijay Babu was born in Kollam, Kerala to Subashchandra Babu and Maya Babu. He has two siblings, Vinay Babu and Vijayalakshmi.

Babu did his schooling at St. Jude School, Kollam and received graduation from the Loyola College, Chennai. He started his media career at STAR India in Mumbai. In 2002, he was selected as the Best Employee of STAR TV. Later that year, he quit his job to venture as an entrepreneur in Dubai. After a few years, he joined as the COO of Asianet and Sitara TV in Hyderabad. In 2009, Babu returned to Kerala as the Vice President of Surya TV. He is married to Smitha, a Dubai-based employee. The couple has a son named Bharath.

Career
In 2013, Babu quit his media career and joined the Malayalam film industry as an actor and producer.

Babu is one of the founders and CEO of Friday Film House founded a Kerala-based film production company along with the actress Sandra Thomas. Friday Film House won seven of the Kerala state film awards in various fields in 2014. Though the company was established after the success of the film Friday, the movie is considered the first production venture of Friday Film House.

Babu is best known for his roles in Philips and the Monkey Pen and Nee-Na, and as the producer of Philips and the Monkey Pen, Peruchazhi and Aadu. His role as Vinay Paniker in Nee-Na received appreciation from critics.

Controversy
On 22 April 2022, a newcomer actress from the Malayalam film industry accused Vijay Babu of sexual and physical abuse over the past two months in the guise of friendship and guidance, and subsequently registered a criminal case which is currently being investigated. In response, he left India and is suspected to be in Dubai, with Indian police having issued a look out circular for him at the airports and planning to search his properties for evidence. In a Facebook Live stream four days later, Babu denied the accusations, claiming to be "the one who is suffering" and stating he would contersue for defamation. While his action received criticism, various men's rights groups came in support of him quoting the one-sided nature of law when it comes to such allegations. Activists like Rahul Easwar and Mithun Vijay Kumar announced MenToo movement on various platforms to protect the actor from media trials and demanded a gender-neutral form of justice. Notably, he named his accuser in the video despite knowing it is illegal under Indian law, leading to him additionally being charged under IPC Section 228A for violating the victim's anonymity and criticism from supporters of sexual assault survivors. While the internal complaint commission of the Association of Malayalam Movie Artists (AMMA) recommended that Babu be expelled, the organisation ultimately did not do so, instead accepting a letter from him distancing himself from the executive board. In response to this inaction, four members (Maala Parvathy, Kukku Parameswaran, Shweta Menon and Hareesh Peradi) criticized AMMA's stance and left the association.

Filmography

Awards
 Kerala State Film Awards
 2014 – Best Children's Film for Philips and the Monkey Pen

References

External links 
 Official website of  Friday Film House
 

Living people
Male actors from Kollam
Male actors in Malayalam cinema
Indian male film actors
Indian male child actors
20th-century Indian male actors
21st-century Indian male actors
Malayalam film producers
Businesspeople from Kollam
Film producers from Kerala
1976 births